1,2,3,4-Tetraphenylnaphthalene is a polycyclic aromatic hydrocarbon commonly prepared in the undergraduate teaching laboratory as an introduction to the Diels-Alder reaction, in this case between benzyne, which acts as the dienophile, (generated in situ) and tetraphenylcyclopentadienone, which acts as the diene. It has two crystalline forms, and therefore has two different melting points.

References

Naphthalenes